Qaleh-ye Heydar or Qaleh Heydar or Qaleh-i-Haidar may refer to:
 Qaleh-ye Heydar, Bushehr